The Beijing Bucks are a Chinese professional men's basketball club based in Beijing, playing in the National Basketball League (China) (NBL). Since 2018 the team has been owned by the CITIC Guoan Group.

Current roster

Notable players
Devonte Upson (born 1993)

References

Sport in Beijing
Basketball teams in China